Fabius Township is an inactive township in Marion County, in the U.S. state of Missouri.

Fabius Township was established in 1827, taking its name from the Fabius River.

References

Townships in Missouri
Townships in Marion County, Missouri